Shades is the only studio album by American contemporary R&B group Shades, released July 15, 1997 via Motown Records. The album did not chart in the United States; however, the first two singles, "Tell Me (I'll Be Around)" and "Serenade", peaked at #50 and #88 on the Billboard Hot 100, respectively.

In addition to original material, the album contains covers of two songs: "How Deep Is Your Love", originally performed by Bee Gees; and "Time Will Reveal", originally performed by DeBarge.

Track listing

Samples

A.
B.
C.
D.

References

External links
 
 

1997 debut albums
Albums produced by Eddie F
Albums produced by Andre Harrell
Contemporary R&B albums by American artists
Motown albums